Ellen Osiier (13 August 1890 – 6 September 1962) was a Danish foil fencer. Osiier was born in Hjørring, Nordjylland, Denmark.

The 1924 Summer Olympics in Paris was the first Olympic Games to feature women's fencing. Osiier, then 33, won the gold medal and undefeated in the 16 matches she fenced in the event. With this victory, Osiier became the Olympics' first woman fencing champion.

Her husband, Ivan Osiier, fenced in seven Olympics, won a silver medal in individual épée for Denmark at the 1912 Olympics, and won 25 Danish national championships in three weapons.

See also
Fencing at the 1924 Summer Olympics
List of select Jewish fencers

References

External links
Olympic results
Statutes of Ellen and Ivan Ossier
Hebrew article regarding stamp commemoration of Osiier's standing as one of the best Jewish female fencers

1890 births
Danish female foil fencers
Jewish female foil fencers
Jewish Danish sportspeople
Olympic fencers of Denmark
Olympic gold medalists for Denmark
Fencers at the 1924 Summer Olympics
Olympic medalists in fencing
People from Hjørring
1962 deaths
Medalists at the 1924 Summer Olympics
Sportspeople from the North Jutland Region